This is a list of electoral district results for the 1938 Queensland state election.

At the time, the voting system in Queensland was based on contingency voting, which was similar to the modern optional preferential voting system. In electorates with 3 or more candidates, preferences were not distributed if a candidate received more than 50% of the primary vote.

If none received more than 50%, all except the top two candidates were eliminated from the count and their preferences distributed between the two leaders, with the one receiving the most votes declared the winner.

Results by electoral district

Albert

Aubigny 

 Preferences were not distributed.

Barcoo

Baroona

Bowen

Bremer

Brisbane

Bulimba 

 Preferences were not distributed.

Bundaberg

Buranda 

 Preferences were not distributed.

Cairns 

 Preferences were not distributed.

Carnarvon

Carpentaria

Charters Towers

By-election 

 This by-election was caused by the death of William Wellington. It was held on 27 May 1939.

Cook 

 Preferences were not distributed.

Cooroora 

 Preferences were not distributed.

Cunningham

Dalby

East Toowoomba

Enoggera 

 Preferences were not distributed.

Fassifern

Fitzroy 

 Preferences were not distributed.

Fortitude Valley 

 Preferences were not distributed.

Gregory

By-election 

 This by-election was caused by the death of George Pollock. It was held on 27 May 1939.

Gympie

Hamilton

Herbert 

 Preferences were not distributed.

By-election 

 This by-election was caused by the death of Percy Pease. It was held on 9 November 1940.

Ipswich

Isis

Ithaca

Kelvin Grove

Kennedy

Keppel 

 Preferences were not distributed.

Kurilpa

Logan

Mackay

Maranoa

Maree 

 Preferences were not distributed.

Maryborough 

 Preferences were not distributed.

Merthyr

By-election 

 This by-election was caused by the death of James Keogh. It was held on 9 November 1940.

Mirani

Mundingburra 

 Preferences were not distributed.

Murrumba 

 Preferences were not distributed.

Nanango

Normanby 

 Preferences were not distributed.

Nundah

Oxley

Port Curtis

Rockhampton 

 Preferences were not distributed.

Sandgate

South Brisbane

Stanley

The Tableland 

 Preferences were not distributed.

Toowong

Toowoomba 

 Preferences were not distributed.

Townsville 

 Preferences were not distributed.

By-election 

 This by-election was caused by the death of Maurice Hynes. It was held on 27 May 1939.

Warrego

Warwick

West Moreton 

 Preferences were not distributed.

Wide Bay

Windsor

Wynnum

See also 

 1938 Queensland state election
 Candidates of the Queensland state election, 1938
 Members of the Queensland Legislative Assembly, 1938-1941

References 

Results of Queensland elections